Kantheti Satyanarayana Raju is an Indian politician and member of the Bharatiya Janata Party. Raju was a member of the Andhra Pradesh Legislative Council as a nominated member.

References 

People from West Godavari district
Bharatiya Janata Party politicians from Andhra Pradesh
Members of the Andhra Pradesh Legislative Council
Living people
Indian National Congress politicians
21st-century Indian politicians
Year of birth missing (living people)
Indian National Congress politicians from Andhra Pradesh